The third season of the French television series Nouvelle Star on M6 began on 10 February 2005. On the final broadcast on 12 May 2004, the title was won by Myriam Abel.

All four judges of season 2 returned, being André Manoukian, Dove Attia, Marianne James and Manu Katché. Benjamin Castaldi continued to host the show for a third season.

In the final, Myriam Abel was declared winner by public vote, with Pierrick Lilliu as runner-up.

Finals

Finalists
(ages stated at time of contest)

Live show details

Pre Live Show (10 March 2005)

Live Show 1 (17 March 2005)
Theme: 100% Hits

Live Show 2 (24 March 2005)
Theme: Rock Hits

Live Show 3 (31 March 2005)
Theme: Film Hits

Live Show 4 (7 April 2005)
Theme: Disco Hits

Live Show 5 (14 April 2005)
Theme: 100% French Hits

Live Show 6 (21 April 2005)
Theme: Love Songs

Live Show 7 (28 April 2005)
Theme: Viewers' Choice

Live Show 8: Semi-final (5 May 2005)

Live final (12 May 2005)

External links 
 Official site

Season 03
2005 French television seasons